Rodolfo Valentin (born June 22, 1944) is a New York City hairdresser and entrepreneur. Beginning his career as a fashion model in Buenos Aires, Argentina, Valentin later emigrated to New York and opened an elegant salon in Madison Avenue. Now He owns three hair salons within the New York City area with products and services that include hair extension, and hair coloring.

Valentin is also an active philanthropist. He currently supports the AFSP, Alzheimer's Association, and has set up his own charity organization Sofia's Hair 4 Health Foundation.

Early life and career
Valentin was born in Buenos Aires, Argentina. The son of Spanish and Italian parents, from an early age he had dreams of becoming a plastic surgeon when he grew up.  However Valentin became more interested in his future profession after years of playing the hairdresser to his mother and sister. His aunt, who had studied at a local beauty school in Buenos Aires, would later teach Valentin some of the techniques she had learned. He initially worked as a fashion model.

Moving to Europe, Valentin assisted hair stylist Alexandre de Paris in Spain and Italy. It was around this time that Valentin found a liking for the Five Towns area of Long Island, New York, later claiming "Five Towns is my Beverly Hills". He purchased a mansion in Hewlett Bay Park; he would go on to stay in the area for eighteen years.

Two years after immigrating to Long Island in 1984, Valentin opened Rodolfo Valentin's salon and spa to the general public. Since then he has opened two further salons in the New York area.

Valentin's patented method of hair extension, the "Hair Infusion", was featured in the book Forget the Facelift by dermatologist Doris J. Day.

He lives in Hewlett Bay Park with longtime companion and business partner Jorge Maria Perez.
Rodolfo Valentin is known in New York City as a society hair stylist.

Philanthropy

When he was a child Valentin had decided to help those suffering from hair loss due to chemotherapy treatment. His desire to do so arose after seeing the depression his mother (who later died from breast cancer) suffered from after losing her hair. "I promised my mother that I would help everyone with this, and make the perfect piece for chemo patients", he said.

To accomplish this, in 2002 Valentin founded the Sofia's Hair 4 Health foundation which offers free hair pieces for those undergoing chemotherapy treatment. To qualify the person must earn fewer than thirty thousand dollars per year. "Some ladies don't make enough money", he said. "If they make $20,000, they don't make enough money to pay for the prosthesis."

Between one and three people are chosen every month by the organization. Nominations can originate from the person's own application, his or her friends, family members or medical caretakers. Applicants must also currently be under treatment and suffering hair loss due to treatments.

Valentin also helps other charity organizations by donating money to them.  He currently supports the American Foundation for Suicide Prevention, Alzheimer's Association and the Hellenic Times Scholarship Foundation.
On October 27, 2011, Rodolfo Valentin has donated 1,000 hair prosthesis to the "Hewlett House 1 in 9". The organization name derivates from the fact that 1 in 9 people living in Long Island NY is being diagnosed with breast cancer.
On October 23, 2012, Rodolfo Valentin was named "New Yorker of the Week" as per New York Television Chanel 1.
On December 21, 2012, Rodolfo Valentin Long Island Beauty Center has been honored with the #1 Salon Long Island award by longislandbest.net

References

1944 births
Living people
American hairdressers
People from Buenos Aires
Argentine emigrants to the United States
Argentine male models
American LGBT businesspeople
People from Nassau County, New York